This is a list of Christian religious houses in Switzerland for either men or women, whether in operation or not.



A
All Saints Abbey (Kloster Allerheiligen) (dissolved), at Schaffhausen: Benedictine monks (1049/50-1529)
Au Abbey (Kloster Au or Kloster in der Au), at Trachslau near Einsiedeln (Schwyz): initially 4 independent women's communities first documented in 1359; became a single community in Vordere Au c.1530; became Benedictine nuns in 1617 under Einsiedeln Abbey; raised to the status of abbey in 1984; extant

Ayent Priory (Prieuré d'Ayent, Prieuré de Saint-Romain) (dissolved), at Ayent (Valais): Benedictine monks (before 1107-1620)

B
Baulmes Priory (Prieuré de Baulmes, Prieuré Saint-Marie, Prieuré Notre-Dame et Saint-Michel) (dissolved) at Baulmes (Vaud): Rule of St. Columbanus, later Benedictine monks (652-before 1123); Cluniacs (before 1123-1536/37)
Beerenberg Abbey or Mariazell Abbey (Kloster Mariazell am Beerenberg) (dissolved), at Wülflingen (Winterthur): hermitage (1318-1355); Franciscan friars (1355–65); Augustinian Canons (1365-1527/28)
Beinwil Abbey (Kloster Beinwil) (dissolved), at Beinwil (Solothurn): Benedictine monks (1085-1554)
Bellelay Abbey (Abbaye de Bellelay)  (dissolved), at Bellelay (Berne): Premonstratensians (1136-1797)
Bellerive Abbey (Abbaye de Bellerive) (dissolved), at Collonge-Bellerive (Geneva): Cistercian nuns (1150-c.1542)
Bellevaux Abbey (Abbaye de Bellevaux) (dissolved), at Lausanne (Vaud): Cistercian nuns (founded 1267/68; Cistercian from 1274x1293-1536)
Bellinzona (Ticino):
 Collegiate church (founded before 1168; extant)
Augustinian Canons (1444/45-1811/12)
Santa Maria della Grazie: Franciscan friars (1481x83-1848)
Jesuits (1646-1675)
Benedictine priory: monks (1675-1852)
Ursuline nuns (1730-1848)
Benken Abbey (Kloster Benken) (dissolved), at Benken (St. Gallen): monks of unknown order, possibly Benedictine (before 741-mid/late 9th century)
Berlai Priory or Mont-Berlai Priory (Prieuré de Berlai, Prieuré Sainte-Marie-Madeleine de Berlai) (dissolved), at Avenches (Vaud): Benedictine monks (founded before 1134; deserted by 1216)
Blonay Priory (Prieuré de Blonay) (dissolved), at Blonay (Vaud): Benedictine monks (before 1210-1536)
Bollingen Priory (Kloster Bollingen) (dissolved), at Bollingen (St. Gallen): Cistercian nuns, later Premonstratensian nuns (founded shortly after 1229; dissolved 1267)
Bonmont Abbey (Abbaye de Bonmont) (dissolved), at Chéserex (Vaud): Cistercian monks (1110x20-1536)
Bremgarten (Aargau):
Capuchin friary, Bremgarten (dissolved): Capuchins (1617-1841)
St. Clare's Priory, Bremgarten (Frauenkloster St. Klara) (dissolved): Beguines (before 1406); Franciscan Tertiaries (1406-1798)
Broc Priory (Prieuré de Broc) (dissolved), at Broc (Fribourg): Benedictine monks (before 1228-1577)
Bubikon Commandery (Kommende Bubikon) (dissolved), at Bubikon (Zürich): Knights Hospitallers (1184x1198-1789)
Burier Priory (Prieuré de Burier) (dissolved), at Montreux (Vaud): Benedictine monks (before 1163-1536)

C

Cappel, see Kappel
Cazis Priory, at Cazis (Graubünden): canonesses or nuns (late 7th or early 8th century-1156); Augustinian canonesses (1156-1570); Dominican nuns (from 1647; extant)
Claro Abbey (Santa Maria Assunta di Claro), at Claro (Ticino): Benedictine nuns (founded 1490; extant)
Churwalden Abbey at Churwalden (Graubünden): Premonstratensian monks (founded around 1150; dissolved 1803/07)
Collombey Abbey (Abbaye Saint-Joseph d'Arbignon), at Collombey-Muraz (Valais): Reformed Bernardine nuns (founded here 1647; extant)
Cossonay Priory (Prieuré de Cossonay) (dissolved), at Cossonay (Vaud): Benedictine monks (first half of the 11th century-1672)

D

Disentis Abbey at Disentis/Mustér (Graubünden): Benedictine monks (founded mid-8th century; extant)

E
Ebersecken Abbey, later Priory (Kloster Ebersecken; Luther Thal) at Willisau (Lucerne): Cistercian nuns (1274/75-1588x1594)

Einsiedeln Abbey (Kloster Einsiedeln) at Einsiedeln (Schwyz): Benedictine monks (founded c 900; extant)
Engelberg Abbey (Kloster Engelberg) at Engelberg (Obwalden): Benedictine monks (founded 1120; extant)
 (originally a double monastery; see Sarnen for the nunnery formerly part of Engelberg)
Engental Priory (Kloster Engental) at Muttenz (Basel-Land): Cistercian nuns (before 1450-1534)
Erlach Abbey, also known as St. Johannsen Abbey (Kloster Erlach or Abtei St. Johannsen; dedicated to Saint John the Baptist) (dissolved), at Gals (Berne): Benedictine monks (1093x1103-1528)
Eschenbach Abbey (Kloster Eschenbach), at Eschenbach (Lucerne): Augustinian nuns (1292/1309-1588); Cistercian nuns (from 1588; extant)

F
Fahr Priory at Unterengstringen (Zurich) / Würenlos (Aargau): Benedictine nuns
Feldbach Abbey or Priory (dissolved) at Steckbach (Thurgau): Cistercian nuns
Abbaye de la Fille-Dieu at Romont (Fribourg): Cistercian nuns; Trappists
Fischingen Priory, formerly Fischingen Abbey, at Fischingen (Thurgau): Benedictine monks
Fontaine-André Abbey at Neuchâtel: Premonstratensians
Fraubrunnen Abbey (dissolved) at Fraubrunnen (Berne): Cistercian nuns
Frauenthal Abbey at Cham (Zug): Cistercian nuns
Fraumünster Abbey: see Zürich
Frienisberg Abbey (dissolved) at Seedorf (Berne): Cistercian monks

G
Genolier Priory (dissolved) at Genolier (Vaud): Benedictine monks
Géronde Charterhouse (dissolved) at Sierre (Valais): Carthusians 

Glattburg Abbey aka St. Gallenberg Abbey at Oberbüren (St. Gallen): Benedictine nuns
Gnadenthal Abbey (dissolved) at Niederwil (Aargau): Cistercian nuns
Gottstatt Abbey (dissolved) at Orpund (Berne): Premonstratensians
Community of Grandchamp at Boudry (Neuchâtel): Protestants
Grandgourt Abbey at Grandgourt (Jura): Premonstratensians

Great St. Bernard Hospice on the Great St Bernard Pass: Augustinian Canons
Grimmenstein monastery: Third Order of Saint Francis nuns in Appenzell Innerrhoden
Gubel, see Maria Hilf

H
Haut-Crêt Abbey (dissolved) at Les Tavernes (Vaud): Cistercian monks
Hauterive Abbey at Posieux (Fribourg): Cistercian monks
Hermetschwil Abbey at Hermetschwil-Staffeln (Aargau): Benedictine nuns
Herzogenbuchsee Priory (dissolved) at Herzogenbuchsee (Berne): Benedictine monks
Humilimont Abbey at Vuippens-Marsens (Fribourg): Premonstratensians

I
Dominican Convent, at Ilanz (Graubünden): Dominican Sisters
Château d'Illens at Rossens (Fribourg): displaced French Trappist monks from Laval 1903-14
In der Au, see Au Abbey
Interlaken Monastery (dissolved) at Interlaken (Berne): Augustinian Canons Regulars
Ittingen Charterhouse at Warth (Thurgau): Carthusians

J
Jonschwil Abbey or Priory (dissolved) at Jonschwil (St. Gall): Benedictine monks

K
Kalchrain Priory or Abbey (dissolved) at Hüttwilen (Thurgau): Cistercian nuns
Kappel Abbey (sometimes Cappel Abbey) (dissolved) at Kappel am Albis (Zurich): Cistercian monks
Kleinlützel Priory (dissolved) at Kleinlützel (Solothurn): women religious, possibly Cistercian nuns; Augustinian Canons; Augustinian Canonesses
Klingental Priory (dissolved) in Basle: Dominican friars
Klingenzell Priory (dissolved) at Mammern (Thurgau): Benedictine monks
Klingnau Commandery (dissolved) at Klingnau (Aargau): Knights Hospitallers
Königsfelden Abbey (dissolved) at Windisch (Aargau): Franciscans and Poor Clares
Kreuzlingen Abbey (dissolved) at Kreuzlingen: Augustinian Canons
Küsnacht Priory or Commandery (Johanniterhaus Küsnacht) (dissolved) at Küsnacht (Zürich): Knights Hospitallers (1373-1531)

L
La Lance Charterhouse (dissolved) at Concise, (Vaud): Carthusians
Lac de Joux Abbey at L'Abbaye (Vaud): Premonstratensians

Le Lieu (Vaud): monastery of unknown rule, possibly a hermitage
Lucerne:
Lucerne Abbey: Benedictine monks
 Franciscan friary, Lucerne
Lully Priory (dissolved) at Bernex (Geneva): Benedictine monks
Lutry Priory (dissolved) at Lutry (Vaud): Benedictine monks
Lützelau Abbey or Priory (dissolved) on Lützelau island, Freienbach (Schwyz): nuns, order unknown

M
Magdenau Abbey at Wolfertswil, Degersheim (St. Gallen): Cistercian nuns
La Maigrauge Abbey / Magerau Abbey (Fribourg): Cistercian nuns
Mariaberg Abbey (St. Gallen): Built as a replacement for Abbey of St. Gall, destroyed before completion in Rorschacher Klosterbruch (1489), rebuilt as an administrative center
Maria Hilf, on the Gubel, Menzingen (Zug): Capuchin Sisters
Maria-Rickenbach at Niederrickenbach (Nidwalden): Benedictine nuns
Mariastein Abbey, also known as Beinwil-Mariastein Abbey, at Metzerlen-Mariastein (Solothurn): Benedictine monks
Mariazell, see Beerenberg
Mariazell-Wurmsbach Abbey, see Wurmsbach
Melchtal Abbey at Kerns (Obwalden): Benedictine nuns
Mistail Abbey (dissolved) at Alvaschein (Graubünden): Benedictine nuns
Montheron Abbey (dissolved) at Montheron in Froideville near Lausanne (Vaud): Cistercian monks
Mount Zion Abbey (Stift Berg Sion) at Gommiswald (St. Gallen): Premonstratensian nuns
Moutier-Grandval Abbey (dissolved) in Moutier (Bern): Benedictine monks
Münchenbuchsee Commandery (dissolved) at Münchenbuchsee (Bern): Knights Hospitallers
Münchenwiler Priory (dissolved) at Münchenwiler Castle (Bern): Cluniacs
Münsterlingen at Landschlacht (Thurgau): Benedictine nuns
Muri Abbey at Muri (Aargau) (dissolved): Benedictine monks

N
Nyon Abbey or Priory at Nyon (Vaud): Benedictine monks

O
Oetenbach Priory, Lindenhof: see Zürich
Olsberg Abbey (Stift Olsberg) (dissolved) at Olsberg (Aargau): Cistercian nuns
Oujon Charterhouse (dissolved) at Arzier (Vaud): Carthusians

P
Paradise Priory (Kloster Paradies) (dissolved) at Schlatt (Thurgau): Poor Clares
La Part-Dieu Charterhouse (dissolved) at Gruyères or La Tour-de-Trême (Fribourg): Carthusians
Perroy Priory (dissolved) at Perroy (Vaud): Benedictine monks
Peterlingen Priory (dissolved) at Payerne (Vaud): Cluniacs
Pfäfers Abbey (dissolved) at Pfäfers (St. Gallen): Benedictine monks

Posat Priory or Abbey at Posat (Fribourg): Trappist monks
Predigerkloster, Neumarkt: see Zürich

R
Rathausen Abbey or Priory (dissolved) at Ebikon (Lucerne): Cistercian nuns
Capuchin Friary, Rapperswil, at Rapperswil (St. Gall): Capuchin friars
Rheinau Abbey (dissolved) at Rheinau (Zurich): Benedictines

Romainmôtier Abbey (dissolved) at Romainmôtier-Envy (Vaud): Premonstratensian canons
Rüeggisberg Priory (dissolved) at Rüeggisberg (Berne): Cluniacs
Rüegsau Abbey (dissolved) at Rüegsau (Berne): Benedictine nuns
Rueyres Priory at Chardonne (Vaud): Premonstratensian nuns
Rüti Abbey (dissolved) at Rüti (Zürich): Premonstratensians

S
St. Agnes' Abbey at Schaffhausen: Benedictine nuns
St. Alban's Abbey, later St. Alban's Priory, (dissolved) in Basle: Benedictines, later Cluniacs
St. Andrew's Abbey, Sarnen, see Sarnen
St. Benedict's Abbey, Port-Valais, at Le Bouveret (Valais): Benedictines
St. Bernard Hospice, see Great St Bernard Hospice
St. Blaise's Priory (dissolved) at Basle: Benedictine monks
St. Blaise's Priory, Stampfenbach (St. Blasianer Propstei Stampfenbach), Stampfenbach in Zurich: Benedictine monks

St. Christopher's Abbey or Priory (dissolved) near Aclens (Vaud): Benedictine monks
St. Gall's Abbey (dissolved) at St. Gallen: Benedictine monks
St. Gallenberg Abbey, see Glattburg Abbey
St. George's Abbey, Stein am Rhein, (dissolved) at Stein am Rhein (Schaffhausen): Benedictine monks

St. Imier's Abbey (dissolved) at St. Imier (Berne): Benedictine monks, later men's collegiate foundation (Herrenstift)
St. Jacob's Abbey im Prättigau at Klosters (Graubünden): Premonstratensians
St. John's Abbey in the Thurtal (dissolved) at Alt St. Johann, later Nesslau (St. Gallen): Benedictine monks
St. John's Abbey, Geneva, (dissolved) at Geneva: Benedictine monks
St. John's Abbey, Müstair, (dissolved) at Müstair (Graubünden): Benedictine nuns
St. Margaretenthal Charterhouse (dissolved) in Basle: Carthusians
St. Martin's Abbey, Fluntern (dissolved) Fluntern, Zürich: Augustinian Canons (1127-1525)
St. Maurice's Abbey at Saint-Maurice (Valais): Augustinian Canons
St. Otmarsberg Abbey, also known as Uznach Abbey, at Uznach (St. Gallen): Missionary Benedictines
St. Peter's Island (dissolved) small priory near Erlach (Bern): Cluniac monks
St. Peterzell Priory (dissolved) at St. Peterzell (St. Gallen): Benedictine monks
Saint-Pierre-de-Clages Priory at Saint-Pierre-de-Clages, Chamoson (Valais): Benedictine monks (12th century to 1580); Trappist monks (1793-96)
Saint-Pierre du Mont-Joux Hospice (dissolved) at Bourg-St-Pierre (Valais): unknown
St. Sulpice's Priory at Saint-Sulpice (Vaud): Benedictine or Cluniac monks

St. Urban's Abbey (dissolved) at Sankt Urban or Pfaffnau (Lucerne): Cistercian monks
St. Ursanne's Abbey (dissolved) at Saint-Ursanne (Jura): Rule of St. Columbanus, later Benedictine monks, later a college of secular canons
St. Wiborada's Priory (dissolved) at St. Georgen in St. Gallen: Benedictine nuns
Sarnen Abbey, St. Andrew's Abbey, Sarnen, or Engelberg-Sarnen, formerly the nunnery of the double monastery at Engelberg, (extant) at Sarnen (Obwalden): Benedictine nuns

Schänis Abbey (dissolved) at Schänis (St. Gallen): women's collegiate foundation (Damenstift)
Schönenwerd Priory (dissolved) at Schönenwerd (Solothurn): unknown rule; later a men's collegiate foundation (Herrenstift)
Schönthal Abbey, Basle, (dissolved) in Langenbruck (Basle): Benedictine nuns

Selnau Abbey: see Zurich
Sembrancher Abbey at Vollèges (Valais): Trappist monks and nuns
Sion Priory or Abbey near Klingnau (Aargau): Benedictine monks
Simplon Hospice on the Simplon Pass: Augustinian Canons
Steinen Priory (Kloster in der Au, Kloster Steinen) (dissolved) at Steinen (Schwyz): Cistercian nuns (mid-13th century–early-mid 16th century); Dominican nuns (1575–1640)

T
Tänikon Abbey (dissolved) at Aadorf (Aargau): Cistercian nuns
Tedlingen Priory or Abbey at Radelfingen (Bern): Cistercian nuns
Töss Monastery at Töss, now part of Winterthur (Zurich): Dominican nuns
Thorberg Charterhouse (dissolved) at Schloss Thorberg, Krauchthal (Bern): Carthusians
Thunstetten Priory or Commandery (Johanniterkommende Thunstetten), Thunstetten (Bern): Knights Hospitallers (1192–1528)

Tobel Priory or Commandery (Johanniterkommende Tobel) (dissolved), Tobel-Tägerschen (Thurgau): Knights Hospitallers (1228–1809)
Trub Abbey (dissolved) at Trub (Bern): Benedictines

U
Uznach Abbey, see St. Otmarsberg Abbey

V
Val de la Paix Charterhouse (dissolved) at Chandossel or Villarepos (Fribourg): Carthusians
La Valsainte Charterhouse at Cerniat (Fribourg): Carthusians, later Trappists
Vautravers Priory (dissolved) at Môtiers (Neuchâtel): Benedictine monks
Vermes Priory (dissolved) at Vermes (Jura): unknown
Villarvolard Abbey or Priory (Fribourg): Trappist nuns
La Voix-Dieu Abbey or Priory at Plasselb (Fribourg): Cistercian nuns

W
Wagenhausen Priory (dissolved) at Wagenhausen (Thurgau): Benedictine monks
Wangen Abbey or Priory (dissolved) at Wangen an der Aare (Berne): Benedictine monks
Weesen Nunnery at Weesen (St. Gallen): Dominican nuns
Werd Friary, formerly Werd Abbey, at Eschenz (Thurgau): Franciscans, formerly Benedictines
Wettingen Abbey at Wettingen (Aargau): Cistercian monks
Widlisbach Abbey or Priory at Rüttenen (Solothurn): Trappist monks
Wislikofen Priory (dissolved) at Wislikofen (Aargau): Benedictine monks
Wonnenstein Friary at Teufen (Appenzell-Ausserrhoden): Capuchin friars
Wurmsbach Abbey at Bollingen (St. Gallen): Cistercian nuns

Z
Zürich:
 Fraumünster Abbey: Benedictine nuns (853 – 1524)
 Barfüsserkloster Zürich: Franciscan friary (c.1253 – 1524)
 Augustinerkloster Zürich: priory of Augustinian friars (c.1270 – 1524)
 Predigerkloster Zürich, Neumarkt: priory of Dominican friars (c.1234 – 1524)
 Community of St. Verena: Beguines (mid-13th century – 1524)
 Oetenbach Priory, Lindenhof: convent of Dominican nuns (c.1237 – 1525)
 St. Martin's Priory, Fluntern, also known as Zürichberg Priory (Kloster auf dem Zürichberg): Augustinian Canons (1127 – 1523 or 1525)
 Selnau Abbey: Cistercian nuns (under the Rule of St Augustine 1256-59; Cistercian 1259 – 1525)
Zurzach Abbey (dissolved) at Zurzach (Aargau): men's collegiate foundation (Herrenstift)

Notes

Sources
 Historisches Lexikon der Schweiz 
 Helvetia Sacra 

 
Switzerland
Monasteries